Gephyra pusilla is a species of snout moth in the genus Gephyra. It was described by Cajetan Felder, Rudolf Felder and Alois Friedrich Rogenhofer in 1875 and is known from Brazil.

References

Moths described in 1875
Chrysauginae
Taxa named by Alois Friedrich Rogenhofer